József Nemes (12 January 1914 – 17 October 1987) was a Hungarian footballer. He played in one match for the Hungary national football team in 1938. He was also named in Hungary's squad for the Group 6 qualification tournament for the 1938 FIFA World Cup.

References

1914 births
1987 deaths
Hungarian footballers
Hungary international footballers
Association football forwards
Footballers from Budapest